The enzyme pyrazolylalanine synthase catalyzes the chemical reaction

L-serine + pyrazole  3-(pyrazol-1-yl)-L-alanine + H2O

This enzyme belongs to the family of lyases, specifically the hydro-lyases, which cleave carbon-oxygen bonds.  The systematic name of this enzyme class is L-serine hydro-lyase [adding pyrazole 3-(pyrazol-1-yl)-L-alanine-forming]. Other names in common use include β-pyrazolylalaninase, β-(1-pyrazolyl)alanine synthase, and L-serine hydro-lyase (adding pyrazole).  It employs one cofactor, pyridoxal phosphate.

References

 

EC 4.2.1
Pyridoxal phosphate enzymes
Enzymes of unknown structure